Jane Singleton  (born 13 January 1947) is an Australian broadcasting and print journalist, company director and public relations professional.

Journalistic career 
Singleton began her journalistic career as a cadet at The Age newspaper in Melbourne. At 22 she went to China during the Cultural Revolution. Later she went to Hong Kong where she sub-edited the South China Morning Post. In Brazil she was correspondent for UK Financial Times and Economist and reporter for the US network ABC. Singleton also wrote for the English language daily The Brazil Herald but ran foul of the Brazilian government. Her visa was cancelled and she escaped to Chile in the boot of a car three days before the assassination of President Allende.

In Australia she worked on regional ABC radio in Albury and Longreach before moving to Brisbane where she became Queensland compere for the ABC program Nationwide. In Sydney she compered City Extra and the 7.30 Report.

Singleton's career in broadcasting has spanned public broadcasting and the commercial media in Australia (2GB, ABC and SBS). She has been a Walkley award judge and federal vice president of the Australian Journalists Association. Career highlights include coordinating Nelson Mandela's visit to Australia in 1990 and working on the Maritime Union's communications during the Patrick waterfront dispute.

Teaching 
Singleton taught journalism at University of Technology Sydney, other Australian universities and at the Australian Film, Television and Radio School. She has delivered innumerable lectures and speeches on journalism, advocacy and human rights.

Community and corporate roles 
Singleton has directed and chaired the NRMA, the Australian Consumers Council, the Council of the Australian National Gallery, the first Federal Presidency of MEAA, the journalists' union and the Executive of the International Federation of Journalists. Jane chaired the international aid agency ChildFund, was on the Executive of the Australian Council for International Aid and was CEO of the Australian Reproductive Health Alliance. She was also a member of the Independent Complaints Review Panel for the ABC. Most recently Jane was CEO and Director of the Sydney Peace Foundation, which awards Australia’s only international peace prize, and she continues her consultancy in advocacy and strategic advice. Singleton is the director of her own public affairs consultancy, Jane Singleton Public Affairs, Pty. Ltd.

In 2020 she published What Katie Did, a biography of K. Langloh Parker, author of Australian Legendary Tales.

Awards 
In the 2005 Queen's Birthday Honours (Australia) Singleton was made a Member of the Order of Australia (AM) for "service to the media and to the community through a range of industry, arts, charitable and consumer organisations".

Works

References 

1947 births
Living people
20th-century Australian journalists
Members of the Order of Australia
Academic staff of the University of Technology Sydney
Australian broadcasters
21st-century Australian journalists
Australian women journalists
People educated at St Catherine's School, Melbourne